The White Rose (translit. Al Warda Al Baida) is a 1933 Egyptian film directed by Mohammed Karim, the author of the silent film Zeinab. It was the second Egyptian musical film after Ounchoudat al-fouad, the success of which led to the musical as the preferred genre of Egyptian cinema.

External links 

 

1933 films
1930s Arabic-language films
Egyptian black-and-white films
Egyptian romantic drama films
1933 romantic drama films
Egyptian musical drama films
1930s musical drama films